Napoleon Amaefule (Greek: Ναπολέων Αμαφούλε; born 26 December 1980 in Nigeria) is a Nigerian retired footballer.

Career

For 2001/02, Amaefule, signed for Polish top flight side Polonia Warsaw after playing for Okęcie Warszawa, Hetman Zamość, Odra Opole, Jeziorak Iława, Lechia-Polonia Gdańsk, Polar Wrocław in the Polish lower leagues, all for half a season.

In 2003, he joined his brother Thankgod at PAOK, one of the most successful Greek teams, as an emergency signing on the last day of the summer transfer window. However, Amaefule only made 2 appearances there.

References

External links
 Napoleon Amaefule at 90minut

Nigerian footballers
Nigerian expatriate footballers
Expatriate footballers in Poland
Nigerian expatriate sportspeople in Poland
Expatriate footballers in Greece
Nigerian expatriate sportspeople in Greece
Living people
Association football forwards
1980 births
Okęcie Warsaw players
Hetman Zamość players
Odra Opole players
Jeziorak Iława players
Lechia Gdańsk players
Polar Wrocław players
Polonia Warsaw players
PAOK FC players
Promień Żary players